Ragibagh (Mongolian:; Рагибаха/Ражабаг;  ; Arigabag), also known as the Tianshun Emperor of Yuan, was a son of Yesün Temür who was briefly installed to the throne of the Yuan dynasty of China in Shangdu in 1328. Although he should have been the seventh ruler of the Yuan dynasty in succession to his father Yesün Temür (Taiding Emperor), he was dethroned by his rival who was installed by a coup before Ragibagh's succession. Apart from Emperor of China, he is regarded as the 11th Great Khan of the Mongol Empire, although it was only nominal due to the division of the empire. He was the shortest-reigning Yuan emperor.

Life 
Ragibagh was the eldest son of Yesün Temür. His mother Babukhan Khatun came from the Khunggirad clan, who had held power through marriage to the imperial family. He became Crown Prince at infancy in 1324. In August 1328 when Yesün Temür suddenly died in Shangdu, he was installed by the powerful Muslim officer Dawlat Shah there in the next month.

However, Yesün Temür's sudden death triggered an uprising of an anti-mainstream faction who had been dissatisfied with monopolization of power by Yesün Temür's aides including Dawlat Shah who had served him since he was stationed in Mongolia as Jinong. In the eighth month, the Mongolized Qipchaq commander El Temür, who was stationed in Dadu, launched a coup and called for installation of Khayishan's son. Tugh Temür was welcomed into Dadu in the same month in which Ragibagh ascended to the throne.

The civil war known as the War of the Two Capitals soon broke out. Ragibagh's army broke through the Great Wall at several points and advanced on Dadu; but was severely defeated by El Temür's troops. At the time, most of Ragibagh's army were involved on the Great Wall front, and the Shangdu court was compelled to surrender on the very next day. Dawlat Shah and most of the leading loyalists were taken prisoner and later executed by the Dadu faction after surrender; but Ragibagh is said to have disappeared after that, evidently murdered.

Name 
Due to scarcity of historical sources and their multilinguality, Ragibagh's name has a lot of variants. The Tibetan Red Annals (Hu lān deb ther) calls him "ra khyi phag". The later Mongolian chronicles such as the Erdeni-yin tobchi and the Altan tobchi spell him Radzibaγ or Raǰibaγ. The History of the Yuan refers to him as A-su-ji-ba (阿速吉八), but it is apparently a misspelling of A-la-ji-ba (阿剌吉八). The initial "a" prevents the word from starting with "r" in Mongolian. It looks like a modern Mongolian painter Ts.Mandir interpreted his name as "Asidkebe" (Ашидхэв). According to some scholars, his name was from Sanskrit "rāja-pika", which means "king cuckoo". He is also commonly known as the Tianshun Emperor based on his era name.

See also
 List of emperors of the Yuan dynasty
 List of Mongol rulers
 List of rulers of China
 War of the Two Capitals

References 

Great Khans of the Mongol Empire
Yuan dynasty emperors
Yuan dynasty Buddhists
Chinese Buddhist monarchs
14th-century Chinese monarchs
14th-century Mongol rulers
1320 births
1328 deaths
Monarchs who died as children
Child monarchs from Asia
Murdered Chinese emperors